Juan Bautista Vert Carbonell (1890, in Carcaixent – 1931, in Madrid) was a Valencian composer of Spanish zarzuelas. He worked in collaboration with Reveriano Soutullo.

Works

References

External links
 

1890 births
1931 deaths
20th-century Spanish composers
20th-century Spanish male musicians